The Victor Valley Transportation Center, also known as Victorville station, is an intermodal transit center in Victorville, California that is served by Amtrak, Greyhound Lines, and the Victor Valley Transit Authority. The center also serves as a park and ride facility for carpooling commuters. The station building is open during service hours, with a waiting area and restrooms, but is locked on weekends.

Services

The station is served by the Amtrak Southwest Chief, once daily in each direction. As of November 3, 2013, the eastbound train stops at 9:10 pm on its way to Chicago, while the westbound train stops at 4:18 am on its way to Los Angeles.

Greyhound Lines operates service north-east to Barstow; Las Vegas, Nevada; and points beyond, as well as service south-west to San Bernardino and on to Los Angeles.

FlixBus does not utilize this station, but rather stops approximately one mile south, adjacent to the Victor Plaza Mall at 14616 Seventh Street.

Since July 5, 2021, the station has served as the primary hub for VVTA routes.

Parking is available in two lots, with the passenger drop-off lot limited to 2 hours and the park and ride lot limited to 24 hours. 

There is a compressed natural gas (CNG) fueling station on site.

References

External links

Victorville Amtrak Station (USA Rail Guide -- TrainWeb)

Victor Valley
Victorville, California
Amtrak stations in San Bernardino County, California
Amtrak Thruway Motorcoach stations in San Bernardino County, California
Bus stations in San Bernardino County, California